Cabela's Outdoor Trivia Challenge is about testing your knowledge on subjects dealing with five categories of outdoor activities and is designed on a boardgame fashion. It was developed by Elsinore Multimedia Inc. and released December 8, 1999.
The game was published by HeadGames Publishing, Inc., in conjunction with hunting supply company Cabela's.

External links

1999 video games
Quiz video games
Windows games
Windows-only games
Cabela's video games
Video games developed in the United States